The Beer Sessions is the eighth studio album by American rock band Sponge, released on October 8, 2016.

Production
Sponge collaborated with several local Michigan breweries during the production of the album, including Kuhnhenn Brewing Company, to discuss the music recording process as well as the process of making craft beer. Each episode, also named The Beer Sessions, was filmed and was available to view for free on the band's website.

Track listing
All songs produced by Tim Patalan and Sponge.

Personnel
 Vinnie Dombroski – vocals
 Kyle Neely – guitar
 Andy Patalan – guitar, backing vocals
 Tim Patalan – bass
 Billy Adams – drums

Additional personnel
 Artwork, Layout - www.dadmgraphics.com
 Booking - Mike Rand
 Mixed By, Engineer, Mastered By - Tim Patalan
 Photography By - Sal Rodriguez
 Promotion [Promotional and Press Inquiries] - Dana Forrester

References

 

 

2016 albums
Sponge (band) albums